Goyty (Ġoytha) is a rural locality (a selo) in Goytinskoye Rural Settlement of Urus-Martanovsky District, in Chechnya, Russia. Population:

References 

Rural localities in Urus-Martanovsky District